Tsim Tung Brother Cream (or Brother Cream for short, also known as "Cream Aberdeen") was a male British Shorthair cat born in 2005 who lived at a convenience store in Tsim Sha Tsui East, Kowloon, Hong Kong. After disappearing in 2012, he became one of the most famous cats in Hong Kong. He died of stomach cancer on 24 May 2020.

Career
Brother Cream lived at a convenience store owned by Ko Chee-shing, his owner. On 10 July 2012 he disappeared, allegedly stolen. Fans of the feline helped to post notices alerting area people about the lost cat. He was allegedly released 20 days later. He was found 26 days later in an alleyway and was returned to his owner. The cat had lost 1.4 kg (3 pounds) while he was away. The incident was published on the front page of local Hong Kong newspapers, and Brother Cream has become one of the most famous cats in Hong Kong since. A little over two months after the incident, the cat's Facebook page had over 26,000 "likes". On 31 March 2013, the South China Morning Post reported that Brother Cream had over 108,000 followers on Facebook. As of May 2014, Brother Cream has over 160,000 likes on Facebook.  he had more than 170,000 Facebook "likes".

Brother Cream had a partner named Sister Cream, a female, Scottish Fold cat that has black and white colouring.

He (and his owner) had also been interviewed on CNN News in 2015.

In May 2016 Brother Cream retired as "manager" of the store when it closed. Living at home with Ko, he has lost some weight; he appeared at a book fair in July 2016 to promote his biography.

It was reported on TVB and Cable news that he had passed away of stomach cancer at his home on May 24, 2020.

Books
In 2012 Ichiban Publishing published Brother Cream in East TST about Brother Cream. On 30 March 2013, Brother Cream was present at a book-signing event for the book at Mikiki mall in San Po Kong, in which hundreds of people showed up to see the cat; the cat's paws were scanned and stamps were created to act as a signature from the cat.  the book had sold more than 20,000 copies. His second book, Cream Chicken Soup, was published in 2013.

Advertising and television
Brother Cream has received coverage on television shows. Due to his popularity, Brother Cream appeared in two television advertisement contracts in 2013, for Nikon and Wing On Travel. Brother Cream was also involved in the filming of a television series to be aired on Citybus, one of the major bus operators in Hong Kong.

Merchandise
Postcards have been created that feature Brother Cream.

Filmography

Television
 Big Boys Club (TVB) (interview)

See also
 List of individual cats

References

Further reading

External links
 Facebook page

2005 animal births
2020 animal deaths
Internet memes about cats
Culture of Hong Kong
Individual animals in China
Individual cats
Tsim Sha Tsui East